The 2019 Queens County District Attorney election was held on November 5, 2019, to elect the Queens County District Attorney. The incumbent, Richard Brown, had announced in January 2019 that he would not seek an eighth term; Brown then died in office that May at the age of 86.

The Democratic primary election was held on June 25, 2019. Tiffany Cabán, a public defender and first-time candidate, led Queens borough president Melinda Katz and four other candidates after in-person votes were counted. However, on July 5, 2019, election officials said Katz pulled ahead in the final count, triggering a recount.  Following the recount, Katz was declared the winner on July 29 by 60 votes.

Democratic primary

Candidates 

Tiffany Cabán, public defender
Melinda Katz, borough president of Queens since 2014
Rory Lancman, member of the New York City Council since 2014, former member of the New York State Assembly (withdrew on June 21, endorsed Katz; remained on the ballot)
Greg Lasak, former judge and former senior borough prosecutor
Betty Lugo, former Nassau County prosecutor
Mina Malik, former prosecutor and former deputy attorney general for the District of Columbia
Jose Nieves, former deputy chief of the special investigations and prosecutions unit of the New York department of law

Endorsements

Results 
As of 11:30 pm, June 25, 2019, Tiffany Cabán held a 1.3% lead over Melinda Katz, with 99.5% of the precincts reporting. Katz promised a recount.  After absentee and provisional ballots were counted, the lead had switched to Katz 34,898 votes to Cabán's 34,878, pending another recount and challenge of provisional votes promised by Cabán's campaign. Following the recount, Katz was declared the winner by 60 votes on July 29.

Republican primary 

Daniel Kogan won the Republican primary unopposed.

Kogan accepted a nomination to become a judge, and stepped aside. The Republican party replaced him as their candidate for district attorney with Joe Murray in August 2019.

General election

Results

References 

Queens County District Attorney
Queens County District Attorney
Queens County District Attorney
2010s in Queens
Queens County District Attorney 2019
Queens County District Attorney